Earl Landaff, of Thomastown in the County of Tipperary, was a title in the Peerage of Ireland. It was created in 1797 for Francis Mathew, 1st Viscount Landaff, who had previously represented County Tipperary in the Irish House of Commons. He had already been created Baron Landaff, of Thomastown in the County of Tipperary, in 1783, and Viscount Landaff, of Thomastown in the County of Tipperary, in 1793, also in the Peerage of Ireland. In 1800 he was elected as one of the 28 original Irish Representative Peers. He was succeeded by his son, the second Earl. The titles became extinct on his death in 1833. Thomastown Castle was the childhood home of Father Theobald Mathew, "The Apostle of Temperance".

The Earls Landaff used the invented courtesy title Viscount Mathew for the heir apparent. Despite their territorial designations and the fact that they were in the Peerage of Ireland, the titles all referred to the place in Glamorgan now spelt Llandaff. The Mathew family was founded by Sir David Mathew (died 1484), Grand Standard Bearer of England. The Earls Landaff were descended from the branch of the family seated at Radyr, Glamorgan, Wales, descended from Thomas Mathew (died 1470), a younger son of Sir David Mathew. In Llandaff Cathedral, nearby Radyr, there exist three 15th-century and 16th-century Mathew family effigies.

The seat of the Mathew family was Thomastown Castle, County Tipperary long abandoned. The extant ruins form a notable landmark. George Mathew sold his estate at Radyr and moved to Thomastown, gaining ownership of the castle through marriage to Elizabeth Poyntz after the death of her first husband, Thomas Butler, Viscount Thurles, of the Butler family.

Earls Landaff (1797)
Francis Mathew, 1st Earl Landaff (1738–1806)
Francis James Mathew, 2nd Earl Landaff (1768–1833)

Rejected claimants
Arnold Harris Mathew, self-styled , also self-styled Count Povoleri di Vicenza (1852–1919).He was founder and first bishop of the Old Roman Catholic Western Orthodox Church in Great Britain, an Old Catholic Church. His episcopal consecration was declared null and void by the Union of Utrecht's International Old Catholic Bishops' Conference.  He claimed his father, Major Arnold Henry Ochterlony Mathew (d. 1894), to have been the 3rd Earl, on the grounds of his grandfather, Major Arnold Nesbit Mathew, of the Indian Army, having been the eldest son of the 1st Earl Landaff, born five months after his parents' marriage. This claim has subsequently been concluded to be based on incorrect information, with Arnold Nesbit Mathew (he originally used the name 'Matthews', as did his son) being in fact the son of William Richard Matthews, of Down Ampney, Gloucestershire, and his wife Anne.

See also
Viscount Llandaff

Notes

References

Sources

Earls Landaff
Extinct earldoms in the Peerage of Ireland
Noble titles created in 1797